Sufism in Spain was practiced in Al-Andalus mainly in the 9th century. Although it did not reach the extent of other lands, it would strongly influence Islam in Spain and Iberian culture in general.

History
The first spread of Sufi spirituality can be traced back to Ibn Masarra (883-931), who wrote works in the line of Mutazilism and Batimi Sufism. His text are lost and what is known about them is due mainly to the work of a later disciple, Ibn al-A'rabi (1165-1240).

The next decades saw a growth of Sufi movements in Al-Andalus, although they did not become organized in tariqa as in other lands, but in smaller groups centered around a master, without a initiation ritual and often without calling themselves Sufi. One of the first true schools formed was that of Ibn al-Arif (1088-1141), although it would be with Abu Madyan (116-1198), who performed a synthesis of Sufi thought of his time, including Oriental, Andalusi and Magrebi, that Sufism would truly blossom in Spain.
His influence was notable, having among his disciples Al-Arabi himself.

Other important Sufis of the time were Ibn Sab'in (1270), and one of his successors, the famous Andalusian poet Abu al-Hasan al-Shushtari, whose works are still in force in the Magreb.

Spanish Arabist Miguel Asín Palacios speculated that the influence of Sufi mysticism reached Christianity. As quoted by Fernando Sánchez Dragó:

Spanish sufis
 Abu al-Abbas as-Sabti (1129-1204)
 Abu Madyan de Cantiliana
 Abu l-Abbas Ibn al-Arif, Ibn al-Arif
 Abu al-Abbas al-Mursi
 Abu l-Hakam Ibn Barrayan
 Abu Marwan al-Yuhansi
 Ibn Arabi
 al-Shushtari
 Ibn al-Mar'a
 Ibn Sa'bin
 Abu Ishaq al-Balafiqui
 Abu Ya'far al-Cochi
 Ibn Abbad de Ronda
 Abu Ya'far Sidibono
 Ibn Jamis
 Ibn Masarra
 Ibn al-Galib
 al-Jarrat

References

Sufism in Europe
Islam in Spain
Religion in Al-Andalus
Sufism in the medieval Islamic world